The 1996 Barcelona Dragons season was the fourth season for the franchise in the World League of American Football (WLAF). The team was led by head coach Jack Bicknell in his fourth year, and played its home games at Estadi Olímpic de Montjuïc in Barcelona, Catalonia, Spain. They finished the regular season in fourth place with a record of five wins and five losses.

Offseason

World League draft

Personnel

Staff

Roster

Schedule

Standings

Game summaries

Week 1: vs Amsterdam Admirals

Week 2: at Scottish Claymores

Week 3: vs Frankfurt Galaxy

Week 4: at London Monarchs

Week 5: vs Rhein Fire

Week 6: at Amsterdam Admirals

Week 7: at Rhein Fire

Week 8: vs London Monarchs

Week 9: at Frankfurt Galaxy

Week 10: vs Scottish Claymores

Notes

References

Barcelona Dragons seasons